The Three Heroes and Five Gallants is a 1991 Chinese television series produced by Shanghai Cable Drama Television (now part of Shanghai Media Group), based on the 19th-century classic novel of the same name (also known as The Seven Heroes and Five Gallants). It is considered the most faithful adaptation of the novel.

Most of the cast members were Chinese martial arts athletes, including Chinese swordsmanship national champion Xun Feng, who appeared in the 1982 classic film Shaolin Temple.

Cast and characters
Xun Feng as Zhan Zhao
Shao Yinglun as Bai Yutang
He Yan as Ding Yuehua
Li Jiabin as Bao Zheng
Zhang Xunling as Gongsun Ce
Lu Weiqiang as Yan Chasan
Wang Jiayi as Yumo
Cheng Liuzhong as Lu Fang
Tang Junliang as Han Zhang
Li Zhanchun as Xu Qing
Xi Weitang as Jiang Ping
Cheng Gang as Ding Zhaolan
Tang Jun as Liu Qing
Wang Tongqing as Wang Chao
Wang Wenjun as Ma Han
Gan Shibin as Zhao Jue
Zhou Guosheng as Hua Chong
Xu Guanzhong as Deng Biao
Zhang Wenlin as Pang Yu

1991 Chinese television series debuts
1991 Chinese television series endings
Television shows based on The Seven Heroes and Five Gallants
Mandarin-language television shows
Gong'an television series